Renegade: the Battle for Jacob's Star is a video game developed by Midnight Software and published by SSI for the personal computer.

Gameplay
Renegade: the Battle for Jacob's Star is based on Renegade Legion.

Reception
A reviewer for Next Generation hailed Renegade: The Battle for Jacob's Star as one of the few Wing Commander III: Heart of the Tiger clones which does not rely on expensive production to emulate that game's success. Particularly praising the 3D fighter models, absorbing storyline, detailed character development, and strategic gameplay, he gave it four out of five stars.

Reviews
PC Gamer (May 1995)
Computer Gaming World (May, 1995)
MikroBitti - Jun, 1995
PC Player - Mar, 1995
PC Games - Apr, 1995

References

External links
Renegade: The Battle for Jacob's Star at MobyGames

1995 video games
DOS games
DOS-only games
Single-player video games
Space combat simulators
Strategic Simulations games
Video games developed in Canada
Video games based on miniatures games